Exomilus compressus is a species of sea snail, a marine gastropod mollusk in the family Raphitomidae.

Description
The length of the shell attains 3.2 mm.

Distribution
This marine species occurs off Vanuatu, New Caledonia and the Loyalty Islands.

References

External links
 
 Fedosov A. E. & Puillandre N. (2012) Phylogeny and taxonomy of the Kermia–Pseudodaphnella (Mollusca: Gastropoda: Raphitomidae) genus complex: a remarkable radiation via diversification of larval development. Systematics and Biodiversity 10(4): 447-477
 Gastropods.com: Exomilus compressus
 MNHN, Paris: specimen

compressus
Gastropods described in 2012